Akram Emmanuel  (born 1 July 1967) is a former Iraqi football striker who played for Iraq in the 1994 FIFA World Cup qualification. He played for the national team between 1992 and 1993.

He scored the winning goal in the 1991–92 Iraqi National League to earn Al-Quwa Al-Jawiya the league title.

Career statistics

International goals
Scores and results list Iraq's goal tally first.

References

1967 births
Iraqi footballers
Iraqi Assyrian people
Iraq international footballers
Living people
Association football forwards